St. Edward High School is a name shared by several high schools:

St. Edward Central Catholic High School (Elgin, Illinois)
St. Edward High School (Nebraska), St. Edward, Nebraska
St. Edward High School (Lakewood, Ohio)
St. Edward's High School  (Austin, Texas)